The Western Museum of Flight (WMOF) is an aviation museum located at Zamperini Field, the municipal airport in Torrance, California. WMOF is operated by the Southern California Historical Aviation Foundation.  It houses not only historic aircraft, many of which were built in Southern California, but also has an extensive collection of historic photographs and blueprints.

The museum has several rare aircraft among its collection, including the second Northrop YF-23 Advanced Tactical Fighter (ATF) 5th generation stealth fighter demonstrator. Also on display is the first Northrop YF-17 Cobra, a lightweight fighter which was the basis for the Boeing (originally McDonnell-Douglas) F/A-18 Hornet currently used by the United States Navy and Marine Corps. In addition, a Grumman F-14 Tomcat and Douglas A-4A, plus numerous other notable jet- and propeller-drive airplanes.

The WMOF is one of two museums that house the only surviving Jack Northrop flying wings (Northrop N-1M at the Steven F. Udvar-Hazy Center annex of the National Air and Space Museum and the Northrop JB-1 Bat glider (crewed) at the WMOF).

See also
List of aerospace museums

References

External links

Western Museum Of Flight Home Page
Static Displays at the Western Museum Of Flight

Aerospace museums in California
Museums in Los Angeles County, California